Fresnel was a French Navy  of the M6 ​​series commissioned in 1932. She participated in World War II, first on the side of the Allies from 1939 to June 1940, then in the navy of Vichy France until she was scuttled at Toulon in November 1942. She was never again seaworthy, but the Italians seized her and refloated her, and the Germans later took control of her. She was sunk in March 1944.

Characteristics

Fresnel was part of a fairly homogeneous series of 31 deep-sea patrol submarines also called "1,500-tonners" because of their displacement. All entered service between 1931 and 1939.

They displaced  on the surface and  underwater. When submerged, their two electric motors produced a combined  and allowed them to reach .

Construction and commissioning

Fresnel was ordered under the 1925 program. Laid down at Ateliers et Chantiers de Saint-Nazaire Penhoët in Saint-Nazaire, France, on 7 July 1927 with the hull number Q143, Fresnel was launched on 8 June 1929. While fitting out, she suffered serious damage when, on  during a test at Brest, France, in which her diesel engines were run in reverse, the control system for her stern diving planes broke, allowing them to move in a way that damaged both of her propellers and caused significant damage to her engines. After repairs and successful completion of her sea trials, she was commissioned on 22 February 1932.

Service history

On 5 January 1933, a fire broke out aboard Fresnel while she was at Toulon, France.

In 1933 and 1934, Fresnel conducted a scientific cruise to collect gravimetric measurements in the northwestern Mediterranean Basin. During the cruise, a French hydrographic engineer made 30 gravimetric measurements.

On 5 June 1937, a reorganization of the French Navy′s submarine force took place which also called for French submarines to conduct long cruises to test the endurance of their personnel and equipment.

World War II

French Navy
At the start of World War II in September 1939, Fresnel was assigned to the 3rd Submarine Division of the 3rd Submarine Squadron of the 1st Flotilla of the 2nd Squadron, based at Toulon. Her sister ships Achéron, and  made up the rest of the division. She initially patrolled off the Canary Islands, where German merchant ships — which the Allies suspected of serving as supply ships for German U-boats — had taken refuge at the beginning of the war. During these patrols, her crew boarded the Portuguese ocean liner  and took prisoner eight Germans they found on board.

On 29 December 1939, Fresnel was patrolling in the Canary Islands when she stopped the British steam cargo ship  by firing a warning shot, allowing Patriot to proceed after determining that she was not a German blockade runner. As of 6 February 1940, she and the other submarines of her division were based at Casablanca and still assigned to patrol in the Canary Islands, but Fresnel later was transferred to Bizerte in Tunisia. 

German ground forces advanced into France on 10 May 1940, beginning the Battle of France, and Italy declared war on France on 10 June 1940 and joined the invasion. On 10 June 1940, Fresnel got underway from Bizerte, and she patrolled between Bizerte and Cape Serrat from 11 to 13 June 1940 to defend the coast of Tunisia against a possible Italian amphibious landing. The Battle of France ended in France's defeat and an armistice with Germany and Italy which went into effect on 25 June 1940. Fresnel was recalled from her patrol that day.

Vichy France
After France's surrender, Fresnel served in the naval forces of Vichy France. She spent time at Toulon, then on 16 April 1941 departed Toulon in company with Actéon and their sister ship  to transfer to Casablanca. Soon after arriving at Casablanca, Fresnel and Actéon got back underway on 22 April 1941 for a training cruise along the coast of French Morocco. They called at Safi on 23 April, at Agadir from 24 to 25 April, and at Mogador  from 26 to 28 April before returning to Casablanca on 29 April 1941.

By 1 January 1942, Fresnel was assigned to the 5th Submarine Division at Casablanca along with Actéon, Henri Poincaré, and Pascal. On 25 September 1942, she began a stay at Fedala, French Morocco, which lasted until Actéon relieved her on 13 October 1942. 

In November 1942, the submarines of the 5th Submarine Division received orders to proceed to Toulon to undergo a major overhaul, but Fresnel and Actéon were still in French North Africa at Oran in Algeria when Allied forces landed on the coast of North Africa in Operation Torch on 8 November 1942. As soon as the French detected the landings at Arzew, Algeria, Fresnel, Actéon, and the submarine  received orders at 02:50 on 8 November to get underway from Oran to oppose the landings. A British shell damaged Fresnel slightly just after she cast off, and she survived the detonation of five depth charges without further damage. At 10:45, as she prepared to fire a spread of five torpedoes at the British light cruiser , the premature launch of one of her torpedoes gave away her position. Jamaica sighted and evaded her torpedoes, and Fresnel subsequently survived three days of gunfire and depth-charging by counterttacking British warships, which pursued her all the way to the limits of Spanish territorial waters. After finally breaking contact with them on 11 November 1942, Fresnel found herself without further orders, so on her own initiative she headed for Toulon, which she reached on 13 November 1942.

Fresnel was in drydock in the Missiessy Docks at Toulon when Germany and Italy occupied the Free Zone of Vichy France on 27 November 1942,  and she was among the French vessels scuttled at Toulon to prevent their seizure by Germany when German forces entered Toulon that day.

Italy and Germany
The Germans seized Fresnel and handed her over to the Italians, who refloated her on either 28 or 29 January 1943, according to different sources, planning to refit her. She was sunk again on 19 February 1943, but the Italians refloated her again on 4 May 1943. The Germans seized her when Italy surrendered to the Allies and switched to the Allied side in accordance with the terms of the Armistice of Cassibile on 9 September 1943. Allied aircraft sank her for the final time on 11 March 1944.

References

Citations

Bibliography

 .
 
 
 
 

Redoutable-class submarines (1928)
1929 ships
Ships built in France
World War II submarines of France
Maritime incidents in 1930
Maritime incidents in 1933
Maritime incidents in November 1942
Maritime incidents in February 1943
Maritime incidents in March 1944
Shipwrecks in the Mediterranean Sea
World War II warships scuttled at Toulon
Lost submarines of France
Naval ships of France captured by Italy during World War II